Marika Eensalu (until 1971 Marika Bahvalova; born 20 September 1947) is an Estonian opera singer (mezzo-soprano) and music pedagogue. 
She was born in Tallinn and attended schools in Peri before enrolling at the Tallinn University of Technology. After graduation, she worked at the AS Kommunaalprojekt construction design company. Eensalu sang in the Estonian girls' choir Ellerhein, and later with the Aare Rüütel Orchestra and studied singing at the Estonian SSR State Philharmonic. In 1973, she graduated from Ludmilla Issakova's class of classical singing at the Tallinn Music School. In 1978, she graduated from the Tallinn State Conservatory.

From 1970 to 1980 she sang with the Estonia Theatre's choir. From 1980 until 1997, she was an Estonia Theatre soloist.

From 1988 to 1990 she taught at the Tallinn State Conservatory. Since 1990 she is teaching at Georg Ots Tallinn Music College. Students have included Kädy Plaas and Maria Veretenina. Her husband is actor and theatre director Ivo Eensalu.

Awards:
 1986: Merited Artist of Estonian SSR
 1989: Georg Ots' prize

Roles

 La Frugola – Giacomo Puccini's "Il tabarro"
 Catharina – Eduard Tubinİ's "Reigi õpetaja"
 Marfa – Modest Mussorgsky's "Khovanshchina"

References

Living people
1947 births
20th-century Estonian women opera singers
Estonian music educators
Tallinn University of Technology alumni
Estonian Academy of Music and Theatre alumni
Academic staff of the Estonian Academy of Music and Theatre
Musicians from Tallinn